The Century is a 42-story,  condominium skyscraper in Century City, California. Completed in late 2009, the building has 42 floors, making it the 22nd tallest building in Los Angeles. The 140 unit building was designed by the firm of the 2011 Driehaus Prize winner, Robert A.M. Stern Architects.

History
The Century was developed by Related Companies, and constructed on the site of the former St. Regis Los Angeles, formerly part of the Century Plaza Hotel.

On July 22, 2008 Candy Spelling, the widow of late television producer Aaron Spelling, purchased the penthouse occupying the top two floors of the building. She later filed a lawsuit against the building developers for taking too long to build it.

The least expensive unit sold at The Century was $1,800,000 for a 1-bedroom residence whilst the most expensive was $47,000,000.

Notable residents 
 Rihanna
 Matthew Perry
 Candy Spelling 
 Paula Abdul
 Elizabeth Berkley
 Dorothy Wang
 Nobu Matsuhisa
 Heather Dubrow 
 Terry Dubrow

See also
List of tallest buildings in Los Angeles

References

External links
Official Site

Residential buildings completed in 2009
Residential condominiums in the United States
Residential skyscrapers in Los Angeles
Century City, Los Angeles
Buildings developed by the Related Companies
Robert A. M. Stern buildings